Néchin is a town of Wallonia and district of the municipality of Estaimpuis, located in the province of Hainaut, Belgium, near the border with France's Nord-Pas-de-Calais region. 

It was a municipality until the fusion of the Belgian municipalities in 1977.

The village of Néchin has become known for the number of French millionaires and billionaires living there. It benefits from its location next to the French border, very close to Lille Métropole metropolitan area, and from Belgium's tax laws which are advantageous to people with high earnings from stock or capital gains, compared to the laws in France. Members of the Mulliez family, owners of the Auchan hypermarket chain and Decathlon sports stores, own a number of properties. In 2012 it was reported that Gérard Depardieu was purchasing a house in the village.

References

Former municipalities of Hainaut (province)